Chionochloa rubra, known commonly as red tussock grass, is a species of tussock grass in the grass family, endemic to New Zealand.

Description
New Zealand has 22 endemic species of Chionochloa, including Chionochloa rubra, which has a distinctive appearance from other members in the genus. C. rubra has a long living span, meaning that there is rarely any dead foliage around the plant — giving the species a clean, sleek and vertical look. The plant will grow up to 1–1.2m high in rich moist ground, with seed heads reaching even taller. The leaf blade themselves grow up to 1m long and 1.2mm in diameter, and the plant width itself is 50 cm in diameter (with little rhizomatous spread).
There are usually long hairs next to the base of the leaf and prickle-teeth towards the apex that help distinguish it from other Chionochloa species. There is also rows of short hairs at the base of the leaf. However, in dry habitat conditions such as dry clay soil the plant struggles to grow and may only grow to 90 cm high, causing possible confusion for other species of Chionochloa. Therefore, environment should be taken into account for identification purposes. Depending on the subspecies, the tawny leaves' colour ranges from a beautiful greenish tone to its more dominant rustic colour of bronze or red. Because of this, some may consider it to be one of the most aesthetically pleasing tussocks, as green and red are known as complementary colours. In general, Chionochloa rubra is a tall brown reddish plant with slender leaves that clump together forming its classic arc shape.

Chionochloa rubra has been found to display the unusual phenomenon of producing many seeds in response to decreased seed predation. In contrast, it was found to have a lower seed production at higher predation rate areas. Red tussocks seeds annually at low alpine areas, differs from other Chionochloa sp. Red tussocks mast seeding at higher altitudes. An explanation for these changes is that red tussocks do not have pronounced altitudinal ecotypes, seed predators satiation and mast seeding being ineffective at lower altitudes.

Distribution

Natural global range
Chionochloa rubra is a native species in New Zealand.

New Zealand range
Red tussock (C. rubra) is a hardy grass dispersed from the central volcanic fields and Huiarau Range to Stewart Island, and from the lower area of the penalpine belt to sea level in south of New Zealand.

Habitat preferences
There are two different types of tussock-grassland, the one where commonly small tussock-grasses dominate, called: “Low tussock-grassland”, and other where generally larger tussocks dominate, called “Tall tussock-grassland."
Red tussock (Chionochloa rubra) is distributed in general in Tall tussock-grassland, and covers most of the pumice-scoria soil located on the volcanic plateau at the altitude between 900 and 1200 m. Places associated with wetlands will be changed by the red tussock, because other species cannot tolerate the diminution of light environment due to the master seeding and dense growing habit of red tussock.

Life cycle/phenology
The Chionochloa rubra plant's seeds are dispersed with the use of gravity and the wind. Nature is the plants main pollinating agent with very little use of invertebrates or mammals as pollinating agents. Mass seeding is used as the main technique to prevent seed loss by predators (which are hard to satisfy due to their big appetite) and other competitor plants. Mass seeding is the production of a large quantity of seeds that are released all at once over a large area. It usually takes the plant a few years to produce enough seed to carry out the process. This form of spreading is particularly more prominent in the Takahe Valley in the Southland of New Zealand. Statistics and studies have shown that the mean annual loss ranges from 10–33% during a four-year studies in the Takahe Valley. So if not for mass seeding the plant would not be able to be successful as it is. The seed is dropped on well drained and moist soil where starts to grow. It flowers during the summer season from October to December and grows fruits all around from November to May.

Habitat
Red tussock (Chionochloa rubra) is a most adaptable vegetation which will grow in the exposed and windy environment. It can tolerate low-nutritious, and also can grow in relatively wet or dry soil conditions. It is harsh enough to use one individual specimen plant however, if space allowed, would be better for planted several as a group. Red tussock (Chionochloa rubra) is a useful vegetation for helping to reestablish wildlife habitat, especially useful as a buffer plant around wetland areas.

While the Chionochloa rubra can be slow growing and prefers more cooler, wet and less humid climates. Though once established it is very resistant plan and can take plenty of abuse due to its hardy texture.

Predators, parasites, and diseases
The area of volcanic plateau is no longer untouched, with wild horses and cows having fed on it for many years and more recently rabbits having become common visitors on these tussock lands. But, the status of the red tussock (Chionochloa Rubra) is still primitive.

The inflorescences of Chionochloa spp. are attacked by at least two flies and one moth. Research taken place in Mt Hut, Canterbury, found two flies fed on Chionochloa pallens inflorescences, including the eggs and larvae of Diplotoxa Similis (Diptera: Chloropidae), which appeared in the inflorescences while they grew. The larvae primarily eat flowers, and most Diplotoxa Similis young have pupated by the end of the flowering span, if not over the winter as adults. Another fly was an unclassified cecidomyiid, which lays its eggs in the pollen of the floret during flowering, hatching into early-stage larvae. Late-stage larvae will turn to clear orange and are typically less active. Eventually, these are dropped at the end of the season. The moth is Megacraspedus Calamogonus (Lepidoptera: Gelechiidae) which has large, active caterpillars and appears in the early season.

Cultivation
Chionochloa rubra is grown in cultivation. In the UK it has gained the Royal Horticultural Society’s Award of Garden Merit.

Cultural uses
In ancient southern Māori societies, people used tussock to make leggings that protected their bare legs from speargrass. Tussock was used in paraerae (sandals) for warmth, as it was found to be much warmer with patiti around the feet than without it.

References

External links
 

rubra
Bunchgrasses of Australasia
Endemic flora of New Zealand
Flora of the North Island
Flora of the South Island